Urmston Urban District was, from 1894 to 1974, a local government district in the administrative county of Lancashire, England which covered the modern-day district of Urmston.

The Urban District was created by the Local Government Act 1894. In 1974 Urmston Urban District was abolished by the Local Government Act 1972 and its former area transferred to the new county of Greater Manchester to form part of the Metropolitan Borough of Trafford.

References
A vision of Urmston UD, visionofbritain.org.uk. URL accessed December 30, 2006.

Local government in Trafford
Districts of England created by the Local Government Act 1894
Districts of England abolished by the Local Government Act 1972
History of Lancashire
History of Trafford
Urban districts of England